William I (or in Occitan: Guilhem I) was the founder of a dynasty which bears his name, the Guilhems, Lords of Montpellier. He received his fief (a manor) of Monspestularius (Montpellier) on 26 November 985 from Bernard, Count of Mauguio, with the permission of Ricuin, Bishop of Maguelone.

Without descendants after his death, his nephew Guilhem II of Montpellier succeeded him.

References

See also 
 Montpellier

Lords of Montpellier
Guilhem dynasty